Akbarpur Assembly constituency is one of the 403 constituencies of the Uttar Pradesh Legislative Assembly, India. It is a part of the Ambedkar Nagar district and one of the five assembly constituencies in the Ambedkar Nagar Lok Sabha constituency. Akbarpur Assembly constituency came into existence in 1955 as a result of the "Final Order DC (1953-1955)". The extant and serial number of this constituency was last defined in "Delimitation of Parliamentary and Assembly Constituencies Order, 2008".

Wards / Areas

Akbarpur assembly constituency comprises Akbarpur, Sikandarpur, Rampur Sakarwari & Akbarpur MB of Akbarpur Tehsil.

Members of the Legislative Assembly

Election results

2022

2012

See also

Ambedkar Nagar district
Ambedkar Nagar Lok Sabha constituency
Government of Uttar Pradesh
List of Vidhan Sabha constituencies of Uttar Pradesh
Uttar Pradesh
Uttar Pradesh Legislative Assembly

References

External links
 

Akbarpur, Ambedkar Nagar
Assembly constituencies of Uttar Pradesh